Hymenopenaeus fallax is a species of prawn within the family Solenoceridae. The species is found distributed near the Hawaiian Islands at depths of 617 to 1937 meters. Females can grow up to 104 millimeters. Its species name fallax was given due to it often being confused H. obliquirostris.

References 

Crustaceans described in 2004
Crustaceans of the Pacific Ocean
Solenoceridae